Pselliopus is a common genus of assassin bugs (Reduviidae), in the subfamily Harpactorinae. The genus is restricted to the New World, with 27 species described. Some species, such as Pselliopus barberi, are conspicuous because of their bright coloring and relatively large size. Some species of the genus are of interest as potential biological pest control agents.

Species
Pselliopus barberi Davis, 1912
Pselliopus cinctus (Fabricius, 1776)
Pselliopus cosmopolites Brailovsky, Mariño & Barrera, 2007
Pselliopus dantei Brailovsky & Barrera, 2004
Pselliopus flaviceps Brailovsky & Barrera, 2004	
Pselliopus inermis (Champion, 1899)
Pselliopus infuscatus (Champion, 1899)
Pselliopus ivanicus Brailovsky & Barrera, 2004
Pselliopus karlenae Hussey, 1954
Pselliopus latifasciatus Barber, 1924
Pselliopus latispina Hussey, 1954
Pselliopus limai Pinto, 1935
Pselliopus lineaticeps (Champion, 1899)
Pselliopus majesticus Brailovsky & Barrera, 2004
Pselliopus marmorosus Brailovsky, Mariño & Barrera, 2007
Pselliopus mexicanus (Champion, 1899)
Pselliopus mirabilis Brailovsky, Mariño & Barrera, 2007
Pselliopus nigropictus (Champion, 1899)
Pselliopus ornaticeps (Stål, 1862)
Pselliopus promeceops Brailovsky, Mariño & Barrera, 2007
Pselliopus punctipes (Amyot & Serville, 1843)
Pselliopus rayonensis Brailovsky, Mariño & Barrera, 2007
Pselliopus rufofasciatus (Champion, 1899)
Pselliopus spinicollis (Champion, 1899)
Pselliopus tuberculatus (Champion, 1899)
Pselliopus ventus Brailovsky & Barrera, 2004
Pselliopus zebra (Stål, 1862)

References

Reduviidae
Taxa named by Ernst Evald Bergroth
Cimicomorpha genera